The 1978 German motorcycle Grand Prix was the eleventh round of the 1978 Grand Prix motorcycle racing season. It took place on 20 August 1978 at the Nürburgring circuit.

500cc classification

350 cc classification

250 cc classification

125 cc classification

50 cc classification

Sidecar classification

References

German motorcycle Grand Prix
German
German Motorcycle Grand Prix
Sport in Rhineland-Palatinate